Sixwire is the self-titled debut studio album by American country music band Sixwire. It was released on June 30, 2002 (see 2002 in country music) on Warner Bros. Records Nashville. The album produced two singles for the band on the Billboard  Hot Country Singles & Tracks (now Hot Country Songs) charts in "Look at Me Now" and "Way Too Deep", which respectively reached numbers 30 and 55 on that chart. The album itself peaked at number 38 on the Top Country Albums chart and number 32 on Top Heatseekers. Lead guitarist Steve Mandile produced the album.

Robert L. Doerschuk of Allmusic gave the album two-and-a-half stars out of five, saying that the band's "collective sound is seamless, spirited, and predictable[…]and their songs reflect all the attributes of commercial country." Country Standard Time reviewer Brian Baker was more positive, saying that he did not consider the band's sound country in nature but adding, "Sixwire makes great pop music that occasionally offers up the sonic touchstones of country[…]and they sell it all with truly impressive vocal harmonies."

Track listing

Personnel
As listed on CD backing card.

Sixwire
Andy Childs – lead vocals, piano
Robb Houston – rhythm guitar, background vocals
John Howard – bass guitar
Steve Mandile – lead guitar, acoustic guitar, background vocals
Chuck Tilley – drums, percussion, timpani

Additional musicians
Russ Pahl – steel guitar, banjo
Dennis Wage – piano, Hammond organ, keyboards
Jonathan Yudkin – fiddle, violin, viola, cello, harp, bells, mandolin, string arrangements

Chart performance

References

2002 debut albums
Sixwire albums
Warner Records albums